The German-Russian pidgin is a macaronic language of mixed German and Russian that appears to have arisen in the early 1990s. It is sometimes known as Deutschrussisch in German or Nemrus in Russian. Some speakers of the mixed language refer to it as Quelia. It is spoken by some russophone immigrants in Germany from the former Soviet Union.

Grammar 

Russian acts as the linguistic substratum, supplying the syntactic structure into which German words are inserted. The German content varies from speaker to speaker, but can be as high as 50% of the vocabulary. The situation is somewhat akin to Spanglish in the United States.

Gender may be influenced by Russian genders, as in the case of most words ending in '-ung', which are always feminine in German, but usually masculine in the mixed language because Russian nouns ending in a hard consonant are always masculine. However, some words inherit their gender from the German noun, as in the feminine какая хорошая  from German feminine die Überraschung, meaning 'surprise'.

A mixed language makes greater use of the uncommon Russian auxiliary verbs иметь , meaning 'to have' and быть , meaning 'to be'. The corresponding verbs (haben and sein respectively) are very common in German.

German verbs are often treated in a sentence as though they were Russian verbs, being russified by replacing the German infinitive verb ending. -(e)n with the Russian -. For example, German spüren becomes шпюрить  - 'to feel', or spielen becomes шпилить, 'to play'.

The following features vary from speaker to speaker:

Adopting the German terms for certain everyday items, particularly if the word has fewer syllables than the Russian equivalent. 
Adopting the German terms for the realities of immigrant life, such as Arbeitsamt ('labor office'), Sozial (a shortening of Sozialhilfe, meaning 'social assistance'), Termin (date), Vertrag (contract).
Literal translation of Russian terms or phrases into German (calques).
Using the German pronunciation of proper names rather than the 'Russified' pronunciation based on the Cyrillic rendering which may reproduce the now-dialectal 18th-century pronunciation, Yiddish or just transliterate from Latin script. For example, in Russian 'Einstein' is written 'Эйнште́йн', and pronounced  (as in Yiddish). But in this mixed language would be pronounced , the German pronunciation of Einstein.
There is at least one example of a neologism. Arbeits'слёзы, pronounced arbaytslyozy, could be a form of the German word Arbeitslosengeld (meaning 'unemployment pay'). The word has undergone an interesting phonetic and semantic shift. Casual or incomplete articulation of Arbeitslosengeld may be vocally realized as Arbeitslose, meaning 'an unemployed person', but the word takes on a new meaning because the Russian word слёзы (sljozy) means 'tears'. The resulting word in a mixed language, Arbeits'слёзы, means 'unemployment pay' but it might be better translated as 'unemployment pain'.

References 

 "Mixed Languages and Cultural Identity" article from the Goethe-Institut (In German)
 Nemrus Dictionary  (In Russian)
   В келлере термин . This resource calls the mixed language "Quelia". (In Quelia)
 Belentschikow, Renate und Ella Handke Об особенностях речевого поведения русскоязычного населения Германии Article on the linguistics of Russian immigrants in Germany (in Russian).
 Zemskaya, Е. А. Особенности русской речи эмигрантов четвертой волны Article on the speech of Russian immigrants (in Russian).
 Zemskaya E. A.: Язык русского зарубежья. Article from the Viennese-Slavic Almanac, 2001 (in Russian)
 Добровольский Д. О. Рец. на кн.: K. Meng. Russlanddeutsch Sprachbiografien. Untersuchungen zur sprachlichen Integration von Aussiedlerfamilien Unter Mitarbeit von Ekaterina Protassova (= Studien zur deutschen Sprache. Forschungen des Institutes für deutsche Sprache; Bd. 21). Tübingen, 2001 // ВЯ, 2002, № 4, с. 137-141. (English title: Investigations on linguistic integration among refugee families)

Russian language varieties and styles
Languages of Europe
Languages of Germany
Macaronic language
Russian diaspora in Germany